Telavåg Idrettslag is a Norwegian sports club from Telavåg, Sund. It has sections for football, track and field and badminton.

The club was founded in 1968. The men's football team currently resides in the Fifth Division (sixth tier). It last played in the Third Division in 1996, after a long stint.

References

Official site

Football clubs in Norway
Association football clubs established in 1968
Sport in Hordaland
Sund, Norway
1968 establishments in Norway